James Murray (1843 – January 16, 1900) was a merchant and political figure in Newfoundland. He represented Burgeo-LaPoile in the Newfoundland and Labrador House of Assembly from 1889 to 1894 as an Independent.

He was born in St. John's, the son of James Murray and Elizabeth Stacey. Murray married Jennie Ritchie. He formed a commission agency and importing company in partnership with his brother. Murray became sole owner after his brother died in 1874. He later expanded into the fishery supply business. Murray ran unsuccessfully for a seat in the Newfoundland assembly in 1882. His election and the election of several Liberal members were overturned in 1894 after they were appealed by the Tories under the Corrupt Practices Act. The political instability that resulted from the Tory appeals caused a financial crisis and bank failures, which in turn, together with the effects of the Great Fire of 1892 led to the failure of Murray's business in 1894. Murray was the publisher of the periodicals Anti-Confederate and Centenary Magazine. He died at home in St. John's in 1900.

References 
 

Members of the Newfoundland and Labrador House of Assembly
1843 births
1900 deaths
Newfoundland Colony people